DeKalb Independent School District is a public school district based in DeKalb, Texas (USA).

In 2015, the school was rated "Met Standard" by the Texas Education Agency.

History
The district changed to a four day school week in fall 2022.

Schools
DeKalb High School (Grades 9-12)
DeKalb Middle (Grades 5-8)
DeKalb Elementary (Grades PK-4)

References

External links
DeKalb ISD

School districts in Bowie County, Texas